Cinthya Domínguez Lara (born October 29, 1982) is a female weightlifter from Mexico. She won the silver medal at the 2007 Pan American Games for her native North American country in the – 69 kg weight division. In 2015 Domínguez was suspended after she failed a drug test (found trace of Oxandrolone).

References
 the-sports.org

1982 births
Living people
Mexican female weightlifters
Weightlifters at the 2007 Pan American Games
Weightlifters at the 2011 Pan American Games
Doping cases in weightlifting
Pan American Games silver medalists for Mexico
Female powerlifters
Pan American Games medalists in weightlifting
Central American and Caribbean Games silver medalists for Mexico
Competitors at the 2006 Central American and Caribbean Games
Central American and Caribbean Games medalists in weightlifting
Medalists at the 2007 Pan American Games
Medalists at the 2011 Pan American Games
Pan American Weightlifting Championships medalists
20th-century Mexican women
21st-century Mexican women